Contact rail may refer to: 
 Overhead conductor rail
 Third rail
 Fourth rail

See also 
 Conduit current collection
 Current collector
 Ground-level power supply
 Guide bar
 Stud contact system